Papilio leucotaenia, the cream-banded swallowtail, is a species of butterfly in the family Papilionidae. It is found in the Democratic Republic of the Congo, Burundi, Rwanda, and Uganda. The habitat consists of forests at altitudes ranging from 2,100 to 2,300 meters. (Albertine Rift montane forests)

See also
Nyungwe Forest

References

D'Abrera, B. 1980. Butterflies of the Afrotropical Region. Lansdowne Editions, Melbourne, xx + 593 pp.
Carcasson, R.H., 1960, "The Swallowtail Butterflies of East Africa (Lepidoptera, Papilionidae)". Journal of the East Africa Natural History Society pdf Key to East Africa members of the species group, diagnostic and other notes and figures. (Permission to host granted by The East Africa Natural History Society)

The Entomologist's Monthly Magazine 44: 249-50  Description
Jackson,T. H. E. 1956 Notes on the Rhopalocera of the Kigezi District of Uganda with descriptions of new species and subspecies Journal of The East Africa Natural History Society Volume XXIII  Figure of male Plate 1

External links
Butterfly Corner Images from Naturhistorisches Museum Wien

leucotaenia
Butterflies described in 1908
Butterflies of Africa
Taxonomy articles created by Polbot